Scott Balderson (born 18 December 1989) is an Australian-born footballer who lasts played for Manly United FC.

Career
Balderson started playing in Australia, and then signed to English Conference National club Stevenage Borough. He came back to Australia, and now plays for Manly United for the 2017 NSW Premier League season. He played a short time in the A-League for Newcastle Jets.

References

1989 births
Living people
A-League Men players
Newcastle Jets FC players
Australian soccer players
Stevenage F.C. players
Manly United FC players
Association football midfielders